Simonésia is a Brazilian municipality located in the state of Minas Gerais. Its discovery is generally credited to the explorers Luciano Galo Nunes and Manuel Antônio Meira. The name of the city is derived from Simon the Zealot, the saint of the city. The city belongs to the mesoregion of Zona da Mata and to the microregion of Manhuaçu.  As of 2020, the estimated population was 19,736.

The municipality holds part of the Sossego Forest Biological Station.

See also
 List of municipalities in Minas Gerais

References

Municipalities in Minas Gerais